SobekCM (alternately Sobek and Sobek CM) is an open-source software engine and suite of associated tools for digital libraries and digital repositories for galleries, libraries, archives, museums, colleges, universities, scholarly research projects as with the Digital Humanities, Research Data Collections, and more. The SobekCM software was developed initially at the University of Florida Libraries by Mark V. Sullivan, with much input from UF and collaborative partners, and ongoing development supported by the full team at the UF Libraries and the larger collaborative community. The largest digital repositories powered by SobekCM are the University of Florida Digital Collections (UFDC) and the Digital Library of the Caribbean (dLOC).

Within the University of Florida Libraries, Mark Sullivan began developing SobekCM in June 2005. The system went live in April 2006. In September 2011, Florida's Council of State University Libraries selected SobekCM to power digital libraries across the state with advanced functionality Development on SobekCM is active and ongoing, accelerated by numerous grants. In April 2012, the Jean-Marie Derscheid collection hosted and supported through SobekCM was part of the Center for Research Libraries' Primary Source Award for Access. In March 2012, NEH awarded a grant to the Historic St. Augustine project, another digital collection powered and hosted with SobekCM. Other major grants awarded from 2012-2013 include: the Florida and Puerto Rico Digital Newspaper Project, funded by the National Digital Newspaper Program (NDNP); Pioneer Days in Florida: Diaries and Letters from Settling the Sunshine State, 1800–1900, funded by NHPRC; Archive of Haitian Religion and Culture, funded by NEH; and Diário de Pernambuco Digital Newspaper Project, funded by the Center for Research Libraries' Latin America Materials Project; and the Panama Canal - Preserving a Legacy, Celebrating a Centennial, Leveraging an Extraordinary Human Achievement, funded by IMLS.

SobekCM is programmed in C# has been released as open-source software under GNU GPL. The SobekCM software can be downloaded from the SobekCM Software Download Site and SourceForge. The site also includes documentation for installing and configuring the SobekCM software.

SobekCM Name
SobekCM is named in part for the Egyptian crocodile god, Sobek. SobekCM's name comes in part of the mythical Sobek's role as a collector of lost things, or "the idea that as a crocodile, Sobek is the best suited to collecting items upon the Nile." SobekCM is Sobek Content Management.

References

External links
SobekCM Repository Software
 SobekCM at the University of Florida
New College of Florida Digital Collections, powered by SobekCM
 University of Florida Digital Collections, powered by SobekCM
 Digital Library of the Caribbean, powered by SobekCM
Wolfsonian-FIU Digital Image Catalog, powered by SobekCM
 NewspaperCat, a portal and record-only collection powered by SobekCM
Florida & Puerto Rico Digital Newspaper Project, powered by SobekCM
Florida Digital Newspaper Library, powered by SobekCM
Video demonstration from 2011
SobekCM Open Source METS Metadata Editor from the University of Florida George A. Smathers Libraries
"Wolfsonian-FIU revamps website, launches digital images catalog" in FIU News mentions Wolfsonian-FIU's use of SobekCM
 SobekCM YouTube Channel

Free institutional repository software
Digital library software
Archival science
University of Florida